Michiei Oto is a molecular biologist and an expert on the application of biotechnology to genetic testing.
He was the first to propose gene literacy education.

Oto was born in Japan. He received a bachelor's degree in biochemistry from Chiba University in 1980 and a Ph.D. from the School of Medicine at Tokyo Medical and Dental University. He is the department director of biotechnology at Tokyo Technical College and a visiting Lecturer at Tokyo University of Agriculture and Technology, Maebashi Institute of Technology and Kogakuin University.

References

Japanese molecular biologists
Biotechnologists
Living people
Chiba University alumni
Tokyo Medical and Dental University alumni
Year of birth missing (living people)